Lucas Miltiades Miller (some sources report his first name as Lucius) (September 15, 1824December 4, 1902) was a Greek American merchant, attorney and politician who served as a U.S. Representative from Wisconsin.

Biography
Born in Livadia in the First Hellenic Republic (a provisional state that existed during the Greek War of Independence against the Ottoman Empire), Miller was left an orphan at the age of four, when he was adopted by abolitionist Jonathan Peckham Miller, an American who served as a colonel in the Greek Army during the Greek revolution.
He accompanied his foster father upon his return to the United States and settled in Montpelier, Vermont in 1828.
He attended the common schools and studied law, being admitted to the bar in 1845.

He began a law practice in Oshkosh, Wisconsin, in 1846, while also owning a general merchandise business with Edward Eastman, a fellow emigrant from Vermont. He also engaged in agricultural pursuits and served as colonel of militia in the Mexican–American War.

He was nominated for the Wisconsin State Senate's Fourth District in 1849 as the candidate of the "Union Democratic Party" (soon to join with the Free Soil Party) faction of the Wisconsin Democratic Party; but lost to John A. Eastman, the Regular Democrat or "Hunker" Democratic candidate.

He served as a member of the Wisconsin State Assembly in 1853 and was commissioner of the Wisconsin Board of Public Works. He served ten years as chairman of the Winnebago County Board of Supervisors.

Miller was elected as a Democrat to the Fifty-second Congress (March 4, 1891 – March 3, 1893), though was an unsuccessful candidate for renomination in 1892.
He died in Oshkosh, Wisconsin, on December 4, 1902, and was interred in Riverside Cemetery.

While serving in Congress, he proposed a Constitutional amendment to change the country's name to "the United States of the Earth".

References

External links

1824 births
1902 deaths
County supervisors in Wisconsin
Democratic Party members of the Wisconsin State Assembly
American militia officers
People from Livadeia
Democratic Party members of the United States House of Representatives from Wisconsin
Farmers from Wisconsin
Businesspeople from Wisconsin
Wisconsin lawyers
Politicians from Oshkosh, Wisconsin
Greek emigrants to the United States
19th-century American politicians
19th-century Greek Americans
Military personnel from Wisconsin